The Eastern States Coliseum, better known as the Big E Coliseum, is a 5,900-seat multi-purpose arena in West Springfield, Massachusetts.

History
Built as the Eastern States Coliseum in 1916, adding to the facilities for the annual Eastern States Exposition, the Big E Coliseum was the longtime home of the Springfield Indians professional hockey team in the American Hockey League, and later served as a part-time home to the New England Whalers hockey team while the team was in the World Hockey Association. In the 1940s through to the building of the Springfield Civic Center in 1972, the Coliseum frequently hosted local showings of the Ice Capades and the Ice Follies. It was for many years the largest capacity rink in western Massachusetts, and was the home arena of several local high school hockey teams as well as a prominent venue for regional and state high school tournaments.

In 1991, the ice plant was dismantled and hockey games are no longer played there. The arena continues as a venue for The Big E, and hosts Shriner circuses, equestrian shows and other local events.  The Coliseum has often been the location for the draft horse World Championship Finals, serving as such in 1998, 1999, 2002, 2003, 2004 and 2009, and has been a venue for rodeos.

Indians and The Coliseum
The first game played in the new arena was a Canadian–American Hockey League game on December 1, 1926. Boxing promoter Tex Rickard dropped the ceremonial first puck. The Springfield Indians lost to the Providence Reds 3–1.  In 1933, the parent New York Rangers decided to pull the franchise out of Springfield, but the Indians were back in the Coliseum for the 1935–36 season when Lucien Garneau transferred his Quebec Castors club to Springfield.

When World War II broke out, the Indians had to be suspended for the duration of the war due to the Eastern States Exposition grounds being commandeered by the Quartermaster Corps of the United States Army for use as a depot.  The Indians were back at the Coliseum for the 1946–47 season until 1972, when the team moved into the new Springfield Civic Center in downtown Springfield at the start of the 1972–73 season.

References

Indoor arenas in Massachusetts
Indoor ice hockey venues in the United States
Indoor ice hockey venues in Massachusetts
Springfield Indians
Defunct National Hockey League venues
World Hockey Association venues
West Springfield, Massachusetts
Rodeo venues in the United States
Defunct indoor soccer venues in the United States
1916 establishments in Massachusetts
Sports venues completed in 1916
Sports venues in Hampden County, Massachusetts
Hartford Whalers